Hilary Amesika Gbedemah is  Ghanaian lawyer and a women's right activist. She has been a member of the UN Committee on the Elimination of All Forms of Discrimination Against Women (CEDAW) since 2013, and she was the Committee's chairperson between 2019 and February 2021.

Education 
In 1975, Gbedemah graduated from the University of Ghana, Legon, with a bachelor's degree in Law. And in 1977, She was called to the Bar. She obtained a master's degree in law from Georgetown University, Washington. She also holds a certificate in International Humanitarian Law from the Henri Dunant Institute, Geneva,  and a diploma in Leadership and Advocacy from Georgetown University.

Career 
She was the rector of the Law Institute in Ghana. In 2013, Gbedemah was first appointed to CEDAW to serve for two. years. During her first tenure, some of the working groups she served on include, Access to Justice, which produced CEDAW's General Recommendation 33 on Access to Justice; the Right to Education; Climate Change and Disaster Risk Reduction; and Inquiries under the Optional Protocol. She also delivered papers at the 59th Session of the CSW in New York and the International Women and Justice Summit in Turkey.

Publications 
Some of her publications include:

 Trokosi: Twentieth Century Female Bondage – A Ghanaian Case Study
 Rape and Defilement
 Interventions available to Victims of Rape and Defilement 
 Safety Planning – Preventing Rape and Defilement and  Enhancing Women’s Representation in Governance through Affirmative Action

References

Living people
Ghanaian women activists
Ghanaian women lawyers
University of Ghana alumni
Ghana School of Law alumni
Georgetown University alumni
1953 births